The Democratic Republic of the Congo issues passports to its citizens for international travel.

On 1 January 2010, the Government officially invalidated all passports not of the series OB, even if the expiry date was beyond 1 January 2010.  Because passports not of the series OB were no longer considered valid travel documents from that date onwards, holders were obliged to apply for new DRC passports in order to travel.

The passport costs 185 US dollars. It has been reported that the Congolese government receives a share of 65 US dollars, with the remainder going to the Belgian company Semlex and the Emirati company LRPS. The contract with these companies has not been awarded in a public tender, and it has been alleged that both companies have ties to the Congolese President Joseph Kabila.

As of 1 January 2017, Democratic Republic of the Congo citizens had visa-free or visa on arrival access to 40 countries and territories, ranking the Democratic Republic of the Congo passport 94th in terms of travel freedom (tied with Djiboutian and North Korean passports) according to the Henley visa restrictions index.

See also
Visa requirements for Democratic Republic of the Congo citizens
List of passports

References

Congo, Democratic Republic of
Politics of the Democratic Republic of the Congo